Frank/Francis McManus/MacManus may refer to:

Frank McManus (Australian politician) (1905–1983), leader of the Democratic Labor Party
Francis MacManus (1909 – 1965), Irish novelist and broadcaster
Francis MacManus Award, an award for short story writing, named in his honour
Frank McManus (Irish politician) (born 1942), former Unity Member of Parliament for Fermanagh and South Tyrone
Frank McManus (baseball) (1875–1923), catcher in Major League Baseball
Francis J. McManus (1844–?), political figure in New Brunswick, Canada